This is a list of South African television related events from 2005.

Events
1 March - Cartoon Network launches its very first Boomerang channel in South Africa.
27 November - Karin Kortje wins the third season of Idols South Africa.

Debuts

Domestic
13 October - Binnelanders (M-Net/kykNET) (2005-2009)
Going Nowhere Slowly (SABC3)

International
8 January -  Foyle's War (M-Net)
5 February -  Lost (M-Net)
2 March -  Joey (M-Net)
2 March -  Two and a Half Men (M-Net)
28 March -  8 Simple Rules (SABC3)
7 April -  Desperate Housewives (M-Net)
20 October -  House (M-Net)
 Fifi and the Flowertots (M-Net)
 Brandy and Mister Whiskers (E.tv)
 American Dragon (E.tv)
 6teen (SABC2)
 Gerry Anderson's New Captain Scarlet (M-Net)
 Legend of the Dragon (M-Net)
 Little Red Tractor (M-Net)
 Mew Mew Power (M-Net)
 Peppa Pig (SABC2)
/ Creepschool (M-Net)
/ W.I.T.C.H. (M-Net)
 Transformers: Energon (SABC2)
 Boohbah (SABC2)
 Funky Valley (M-Net)
 The Island of Inis Cool (M-Net)

Changes of network affiliation

Television shows

1980s
Good Morning South Africa (1985–present)
Carte Blanche (1988–present)

1990s
Top Billing (1992–present)
Generations (1994–present)
Isidingo (1998–present)

2000s
Idols South Africa (2002–present)

New channels
February - MTV Base
1 March - Boomerang

Ending this year
Who Wants to Be a Millionaire? (1999-2005)

Births

Deaths

See also
2005 in South Africa